Liaoning is a province of China.

Liaoning or liao ning or variation, may also refer to:

 Chinese aircraft carrier Liaoning, the first aircraft carrier of the PLA Navy
 Type 001 aircraft carrier, the Liaoning-class aircraft carrier
 Liao ning virus
 2503 Liaoning, main-belt asteroid
 Liaoning Whowin F.C., a Chinese football club

See also

 Liao (disambiguation)
 Ning (disambiguation)